Gilbert Ezra Read (May 6, 1822May 16, 1898) was a Michigan politician.

Early life 
Read was born to parents Rufus and Rhoda Read in Ludlow, Windsor County, Vermont on May 6, 1822.

Personal life 
Read was married to Mary Ann Daniels. Together they had at least five children together. Read was the uncle of Edward G. Read.

Political career 
Read was served as a member of the Michigan House of Representatives from the Kalamazoo County 2nd district from 1861 to 1862. Then he served as a member of the Michigan House of Representatives from the Kalamazoo County 1st district from 1863 to 1866. During this term he also served as the Speaker of the Michigan House of Representatives. Read served on the Michigan Senate from 1877 to 1881.

Death 
Read died on May 16, 1898 in Richland, Kalamazoo County, Michigan. He was interred at Prairie Home Cemetery.

References 

1822 births
1898 deaths
Speakers of the Michigan House of Representatives
Republican Party Michigan state senators
Republican Party members of the Michigan House of Representatives
Burials in Michigan
19th-century American politicians